

Introduction
Digital India Corporation is a not for profit Company set up by Ministry of Electronics and Information Technology (MeitY), Govt. of India, under Section 8 of Companies Act 2013.Digital India Corporation (DIC) leads and guides in realizing the vision, objectives and goals of the Digital India program. It provides the strategic support to Ministries/Departments of Centre/States for carrying forward the mission of Digital India by way of Capacity Building for e-Governance projects, promoting best practises, encouraging Public-Private Partnerships (PPP), nurturing innovation and technology in various domains.

Research focus
Digital India Corporation started with the projects such as World Computer (affordable computing and access devices), Bits for All (low cost, high bandwidth connectivity) and Tomorrow's Tool (rurally relevant applications). It later switched to application development, including information and communications technology for healthcare, education, livelihood and empowerment of the disabled. Since then, Digital India Corporation has taken up 75 development projects. After development, the new technology is taken from the lab to pilot testing, and then for large scale deployment through a scheme of provider/user membership. The organization is currently responsible for the Information Technology Research Academy and Visvesvaraya PhD scheme in electronics and information technology.

Functional model
Digital India Corporation utilizes a way of growth by working with a network of  research academic and private organizations for undertaking development work. It serves as a research hub for the Indian Institutes of Technology. The other partners are a combination of academic and industry research and development institutions, non-governmental organizations, and governmental agencies. The projects are sponsored by corporate bodies, non-profits and the government. The list of project partners has grown to more than 58.

External links
 Digital India Corporation

Information technology organisations based in India
Ministry of Communications and Information Technology (India)
E-government in India